Odontocarya is a plant genus in the family Menispermaceae.

Selected species
Odontocarya acuparata Miers
Odontocarya perforata Barneby

References

Menispermaceae
Menispermaceae genera